Miles Mendoza (born 1966) was a regular contributor on BBC Radio 2's Steve Wright In The Afternoon programme for several years.  He used to present a website review which debuted as Website of the Day but became a weekly feature called Website of the Week.

In 2006, Miles published a book simply called Website of the Day which featured the most popular sites that had been talked about on the radio over the preceding few years.

He now spends his time as a connoisseur of fine cheeses.

References

External links
 BBC Radio 2: Website of the Week
 Website of the Day Archives
 The Official Miles Mendoza Twitter account

1966 births
Living people